Marcos Daniel was the defending champion, but he decided to not defend his 2009 title.
Horacio Zeballos defeated Santiago González in the final (7–6(7–3), 6–0).

Seeds

Draw

Final four

Top half

Bottom half

External links
 Main Draw
 Qualifying Draw

Bancolombia Open - Singles
Bancolombia Open